Storronden is a mountain in Sel Municipality in Innlandet county, Norway. The mountain is surrounded by several other notable mountains including Svartnuten and Steet to the west, Vinjeronden and Rondeslottet to the northwest, Rondvasshøgde to the east, Hornflågene to the southeast, and Simlepiggen to the south.

Name
The first element is stor which means 'large' or 'big'. The last part of the name comes from the words  which was probably the original name of the nearby lake Rondvatnet. Many of the mountains near the lake were then named after this lake.

See also
List of mountains of Norway by height

References

Sel
Mountains of Innlandet